Elina Linna, born 1947, is a Swedish Left Party politician, member of the Riksdag since 2002.

References

External links
Elina Linna at the Riksdag website

1947 births
21st-century Swedish women politicians
Living people
Members of the Riksdag 2002–2006
Members of the Riksdag 2006–2010
Members of the Riksdag from the Left Party (Sweden)
Place of birth missing (living people)
Swedish people of Finnish descent
Women members of the Riksdag